Hamdan Humaid (born 6 November 2002), is an Emirati professional footballer who plays as a midfielder for UAE Pro League side Shabab Al-Ahli.

Career statistics

Club

Career statistics

References

External links
 

2002 births
Living people
Emirati footballers
Association football midfielders
Shabab Al-Ahli Club players
UAE Pro League players